Firewire is the debut solo studio album by American hip hop artist Lateef the Truthspeaker. It was released via Quannum Projects on November 8, 2011. Recorded over the course of four months in Oakland, California, it includes contributions from DJ Shadow, Lyrics Born, Del the Funky Homosapien, and Dan the Automator.

Critical reception
D.L. Chandler of Okayplayer gave the album an 80 out of 100, calling it "an eclectic mix of tracks that showcase Lateef's formidable ability but underwhelms briefly at points." He added, "Firewire may not ignite the senses of every rap fan, but there are enough twists in turns even in its rote moments that keep the listeners engaged over the duration of the album." Mosi Reeves of Spin gave the album a 6 out of 10, saying, "Firewire is chaotically sequenced, like the Bay Area rapper scoured his hard drive for usable material without checking whether the songs actually blended together logically." Tom Birts of The Music said, "Firewire showcases the energy and versatility of an emcee and singer who rattles through hip hop, soul and electro-pop without pause or cause to doubt himself."

Track listing

References

External links
 
 Firewire at Quannum Projects (archive)

2011 albums
Quannum Projects albums
Albums produced by DJ Shadow
Hip hop albums by American artists